Börele is a rural locality (a posyolok) in Biektaw District, Tatarstan. The population was 2241 as of 2010.

Geography 
Börele animal farm settlement is located 13 km northeast of Biektaw, district's administrative centre, and 33 km northeast of Qazan, republic's capital, by road.

History 
The village was established in 1930.

After the creation of districts in Tatar ASSR (Tatarstan) in Biektaw (1930s–1963),  Yäşel Üzän (1963–1965) and Biektaw districts.

References

External links 
 

Rural localities in Vysokogorsky District